Folha Fede is a village on São Tomé Island in the nation of São Tomé and Príncipe. Its population is 831 (2012 census). It lies 1.5 km southeast of Trindade.

Population history

Sporting club
Porto Folha Fede - football (soccer) -- currently plays in the São Tomé First Division as of the 2015 season

References

Populated places in Mé-Zóchi District